These are the squads for the 1964 European Nations' Cup in Spain, which took place from 17 June to 21 June 1964. The players' listed ages is their age on the tournament's opening day (17 June 1964).

Denmark
Manager: Poul Petersen

Hungary
Manager: Lajos Baróti

Soviet Union
Manager: Konstantin Beskov

Spain
Manager: José Villalonga

External links
 RSSSF
 Sportec 1 2
 DBU 
 FFF 1 2

UEFA European Championship squads
Squads